Rhett Butler  (foaled on 26 March 2011) is a Serbian thoroughbred chestnut racehorse bred in Ireland. Rhett Butler was sired by champion  sire Galileo. Butler is stallion to mother Rags to Riches. A champion racehorse by pedigree, Butler has won 8 out of 16 races in Serbia and Hungary.

Races won

Serbia
Kup Princa Pavla G1 (2400 m)
Grad Beograde G3 (2200 m)
Kup Srema (Listed) (2200 m)
Memorijal Darka Filipovića (L) (1800 m)
Kup Ljubičeva G1 (2400 m)
Djurdjevdan (L) (1600 m)
Eldorado (L) (2000 m)

Hungary
Kinscem Dij (L) (2000 m)

References

2011 racehorse births
Racehorses bred in Ireland